The Huawei U8860 Honor is a touchscreen mobile phone running Android, and which targets the mid-high phone market.

See also
 Huawei U8800
 List of Android devices

References

External links
 Official website
 GSM Arena Link

Android (operating system) devices
Huawei smartphones
Mobile phones introduced in 2011
Discontinued smartphones